Georgios Georgiou (born 1979), is a Greek footballer.

George, Georgios or Giorgos Georgiou (Greek:  or ) may also refer to:
 George Georgiou (born 1961),  British photographer
 , British actor; see List of Game of Thrones characters
 George Georgiou (footballer) (born 1972), English footballer
 Georgios Georgiou (Cypriot politician) (born 1957), a member of the parliament of Cyprus from 2011 to 2016
  (born 1936), a member of the European Parliament for Greece from 2004 to 2009
 Giorgos Georgiou (born 1952), Greek TV and radio personality
 Giorgos Georgiou (art director), winner of 2 Hellenic Film Academy Awards in 2012 for Christmas Tango
 Giorgos Georgiou (Cypriot politician) (born 1963)